The Canon NoteJet is a series of notebook computers which include a printer and scanner that was manufactured from 1993 to 1995 by a joint venture between the Canon subsidiary Canon Computer Systems Inc. and IBM subsidiary IBM Japan. The Canon branded series was sold worldwide except in Japan, where the similar IBM ThinkPad 555BJ and 550BJ was sold. The European model did not use the NoteJet branding and was branded as the Canon BN120C, BN22 or BN200.

Reviews during the general availability of the series were mixed. Historical analyses viewed it either extremely positive or extremely negative.

History 
Canon, one of the largest printer manufacturers globally, released their first inkjet printer in 1985. They joined the x86 PC market in October 1992 as Canon Computer Systems Inc. and launched the Innova PC line in 1993. Canon combined these products in the NoteJet series. Bubble Jet and BJ are trademarks owned by Canon, which have been used by IBM for their printer-laptops.

According to Canon, the printer in the NoteJet is 70% smaller than any printer they developed before.

Models 
The Canon branded models were released globally, except in Japan where the IBM branded ThinkPads were released. The NoteJet branding was not used in Europe.

Canon NoteJet 486 
It uses the Cyrix 486SLC clocked at 25 MHz as a CPU. It weighs 7.7 pounds and the dimensions are 12.2 by 10 by 2 inches. The list price was $2499. The CPU was manufactured by Texas Instruments. The NoteJet 486 was made in three different versions: the model 1 has a 85MB disk, the model 2 has a 130MB disk and the model 3 has a 180MB disk.

Canon NoteJet II 486C 
The NoteJet II 486C uses a 486SLC2 processor at 50 MHz and weighs 8.6 pounds. It has a 10.3 inch DSTN and two PCMCIA slots. It has 4MiB RAM with a 130MB HDD or a 260MB HDD.

Canon NoteJet IIIcx 
The printer is based on the Canon BJC-70. It uses a Pentium I clocked at 90 MHz, 16MiB of RAM and a HDD of 810MB. It has an internal PCI bus and IrDA, a Sound Blaster card, two Type II PC Card slots or one Type III PC card slot. It uses an external AC adapter.

Canon BN22 
Canon marketed the NoteJet 486 in Europe as the Canon BN22, because the AC adapter and keyboard have differences.

Canon BN120C 
The Canon BN120C uses a 100 MHz Intel 486, 810MB HDD and 16MiB RAM.

Canon BN200 
The Canon BN200 is an upgrade from the BN22. It has an active matrix 800x600 LCD.

It was sold in three different models.

IBM ThinkPad 550BJ 
It used the 25 MHz IBM 486SLC CPU.

The 550BJ was launched in Japan on 19 February 1993. It was developed within the new self-contained IBM Personal Computer Company which was set up in 1992, separate from the IBM corporate hierarchy. The computer components were developed by IBM Japan and printer components were developed by Canon, with both logos engraved on the machine. The BJ stands for Bubble Jet which is Canon's printer technology. Although ThinkPads are known for their usage of the TrackPoint pointing stick, this machine comes with a "Mini Mouse II-B"

The machine gained popularity mainly amongst beginners and students.

IBM ThinkPad 555BJ 
It used the 486SLC2 as a CPU, which is the 50 MHz version of the IBM 486SLC. The LCD was upgraded from a 9.5 inch STN to 10.3 inch DSTN color LCD. The memory was expanded to 12MiB. In contrast to the earlier model, this machine included a TrackPoint II.

Reception 
PCMag reviewed the NoteJet IIIcx in 1996. They noted the slowness of the scanning feature while appreciating the quality documentation from Canon. They concluded that the PC performance was average, but noted the high amount of extra peripherals available. They noted: "the point isn't really how well it works, but that it works at all". According to The Wall Street Journal, users have complained that the NoteJet series was too heavy and expensive.

PCMag listed it in a 2015 article as one of the 7 "Bizarre FrankenPCs That Are Better Off Dead". TechRadar listed it in a 2016 article as one of the 12 "ground-breaking laptops that dared to be different", and argued that was sad that the NoteJet was a one-of-a-kind. PC World listed the Canon NoteJet 486 in a 2006 as one of the greatest PCs of all time.

Further developments 
The NoteJet series was silently discontinued.

Canon left the U.S. PC market in January 1997 due to low sales.

See also 

 List of Canon products
List of IBM products
Multi-function printer

References

External links 

 Canon BN200 diskette backup
 Pictures of the ThinkPad 555BJ

IBM laptops
Computer printers
NoteJet
Computer-related introductions in 1993